was the first single by the Japanese band The Blue Hearts. It was first released on an independent label on February 25, 1987, before the band signed with a record company. Lyrics and music were written by Hiroto Kōmoto, the band's lead vocalist, and was arranged by The Blue Hearts. The track is 5m26s in length. The cover for the single was designed by Junnosuke Kawaguchi, the band's bassist.

The B-side track on the single was "Hammer (48-oku no Blues)" (ハンマー（48億のブルース）), which was written by Masatoshi Mashima, the band's guitarist.

Original recording
The song was originally released as a single on an independent label. It was again released as a single after the band signed to a record label. The new release, however, was remixed and the original recording can only be found on the analog record of the single.

Other releases
The song was never part of a studio album, but it was included on the following compilations and live albums:
Just a Beat Show
Meet the Blue Hearts
East West Side Story
Super Best
Live All Sold Out
Yaon Live on '94 6.18/19

Related media
The song was featured in a 2002 Fuji Television drama of the same name.

A cover version of the song can be heard being played on GuitarFreaks while Charlotte wanders through the arcade in the film Lost in Translation.

A cover version of the song is the opening theme of the 2015 anime The Rolling Girls.

References

1987 singles
The Blue Hearts songs
Japanese television drama theme songs
Songs written by Hiroto Kōmoto
2002 singles